Cyperus stenophyllus is a species of sedge that is native to parts of south east Asia.

See also 
 List of Cyperus species

References 

stenophyllus
Plants described in 1912
Flora of Thailand
Flora of Indonesia
Flora of New Guinea
Flora of the Philippines